Open Water is a 2003 American survival horror thriller film. The story concerns an American couple who go scuba diving while on vacation, only to find themselves stranded miles from shore in shark-filled waters when the crew of their boat accidentally leaves them behind.

The film is loosely based on the true story of Tom and Eileen Lonergan, who in 1998 went out with a scuba diving group, Outer Edge Dive Company, on the Great Barrier Reef, and were accidentally left behind because the dive-boat crew failed to take an accurate headcount.

The film was financed by the husband and wife team of writer/director Chris Kentis and producer Laura Lau, both avid scuba divers. It cost $120,000 to make and was bought by Lions Gate Entertainment for $2.5 million after its screening at the Sundance Film Festival. Lions Gate spent a further $8 million on distribution and marketing.  The film ultimately grossed $55.5 million worldwide (including $30 million from the North American box office alone).

Before filming began, the Lonergans' experience was re-created for an episode of ABC's 20/20, and the segment was repeated after the release of Open Water. Clips from the film were also featured on NBC in "Troubled Waters", a Dateline episode (July 7, 2008) with Matt Lauer interviewing two professional divers, Richard Neely and Ally Dalton, who were left adrift at the Great Barrier Reef by a dive boat on May 21, 2008.

Plot
Daniel Kintner and Susan Watkins are frustrated that their hard-working lives do not allow them to spend much time together. They decide to go on a scuba-diving vacation to help improve their relationship. On their second day, they join a group scuba dive. A head count is taken and the passenger total is recorded as 20. Daniel and Susan decide to separate briefly from the group while underwater. Half an hour later, the group returns to the boat; two members of the group are inadvertently counted twice, so the dive master thinks that everyone is back on board and the boat leaves the site. However, Daniel and Susan are still underwater, unaware that the others have returned to shore. When they resurface, the boat has gone. They believe that the group will soon return to recover them.

Stranded at sea, it slowly dawns on Daniel and Susan that their boat is not coming back for them. They bicker, battle bouts of hunger and mental exhaustion and realize that they have probably drifted far from the dive site. They also realize that sharks have been circling them below the surface. Soon, jellyfish appear, stinging them both, while sharks come in close. Susan receives a small shark bite on the leg, but does not immediately realize it. Daniel goes under and discovers a small fish feeding on the exposed flesh of her bite wound. Later, a shark bites Daniel and the wound begins to bleed profusely. Susan removes her weight belt and uses it to apply pressure to Daniel's wound, but he appears to go into shock. After night falls, sharks return and attack Daniel during a storm, killing him. The next morning, Daniel and Susan's belongings are finally noticed on the boat by a crew member and he realizes that they must have been left at the dive site. A massive search for the couple begins immediately.

Susan realizes that Daniel is dead and releases him into the water, where sharks pull him down in a feeding frenzy. After putting on her mask, she looks beneath the surface and sees several large sharks now circling her. Susan looks around one last time for any sign of coming rescue. Seeing none, she removes her scuba gear and goes underwater to drown before the sharks can attack. Elsewhere, a fishing crew cut open a newly caught shark's stomach, finding a diving camera (apparently that of Daniel and Susan). One of the fishermen asks offhandedly to another, "Wonder if it works?"

Cast
 Blanchard Ryan as Susan Watkins
 Daniel Travis as Daniel Kintner
 Saul Stein as Seth
 Michael E. Williamson as Davis
 Cristina Zenato as Linda
 John Charles as Junior
 Estelle Lau as Affected-Ear Diver

Production
The filmmakers used live sharks, as opposed to the mechanical ones used in Jaws or the computer-generated fish in Deep Blue Sea. The film strives for authentic shark behavior, shunning the stereotypical exaggerated shark behavior typical of many films. The movie was shot on digital video. As noted above, the real-life events that inspired this story took place in the southern Pacific Ocean, and this film moves the location to the Atlantic Ocean, being filmed in the Bahamas, the United States Virgin Islands, the Grenadines, and Mexico.

During the audition, Chris Kentis and Laura Lau made it clear to Blanchard Ryan and Daniel Travis they would be working with real sharks in the film and that it was non-negotiable. "So I was like 'okay, that's fine' and I hadn't been offered the part or anything yet, and then when I was offered the part, that had already been negotiated," said Blanchard.

Reception
Open Water received mostly positive reviews. On Rotten Tomatoes the film has an approval rating of 71% based on 196 reviews with an average rating of 6.57/10. The consensus reads: "A low budget thriller with some intense moments." On Metacritic, the film holds a score of 63 out of 100, based on reviews from 38 critics' reviews, indicating "generally favorable reviews".

Most critics praised the film for its intensity and minimalist filmmaking, while it was not well received by the audience. Writing in the Chicago Sun-Times, Roger Ebert praised the film highly: "Rarely, but sometimes, a movie can have an actual physical effect on you. It gets under your defenses and sidesteps the 'it's only a movie' reflex and creates a visceral feeling that might as well be real". In a much less favorable review, A. O. Scott in The New York Times lamented that it "succeeds in mobilizing the audience's dread, but it fails to make us care as much as we should about the fate of its heroes".

Box office
Open Water was made for a budget recorded by Box Office Mojo as $120,000, grossed $1 million in 47 theaters on its opening weekend and made a lifetime gross of $55 million.

Awards and nominations

Sequels
In 2006, a film marketed as a sequel titled Open Water 2: Adrift was released, although its plot is unrelated to Open Water. A third film in the series titled, Open Water 3: Cage Dive was released in 2017, following the first film's plot of being a survival shark film, although unrelated in continuity.

See also
 Survival film, about the film genre, with a list of related films
 Low budget film
 List of killer shark films

References

External links

 
 
 
 

2003 films
2003 horror films
Sea adventure films
2003 independent films
2000s horror thriller films
2003 psychological thriller films
2000s thriller films
American psychological thriller films
American survival films
2000s English-language films
Films about shark attacks
Films about castaways
Thriller films based on actual events
Films about survivors of seafaring accidents or incidents
Films about sharks
Films about vacationing
Films shot in the Bahamas
Films shot in the United States Virgin Islands
American independent films
Lionsgate films
Adventure horror films
American natural horror films
American psychological horror films
Films scored by Graeme Revell
Films directed by Chris Kentis
2000s American films